McRae is a Scottish Gaelic surname. It may refer to:

People
 Alister McRae (born 1970), British rally champion
 Alexander Duncan McRae (1874–1946), Canadian businessman, Army general, and politician
 Brian McRae (born 1967), Major League Baseball player
 Bruce McRae (1867–1927), American early actor
 Chann McRae (born 1971), American road bicycle racer
 Charles McRae (born 1968), American football player and business executive
 Chuck McRae (born c. 1939), associate justice of the Supreme Court of Mississippi
 Diana McRae, American novelist
 Donald McRae (disambiguation), various people
 Carmen McRae (1920–1994), American jazz singer
 Colin McRae (1968–2007), 1995 world rally champion
 Conrad McRae (1971–2000), American basketball player
 Dandridge McRae (1829–1899), American Civil War general
 Emma Montgomery McRae (1848–1919), American professor of literature
 Graham McRae (1940–2021), New Zealand racing driver
 Hal McRae (born 1945), Major League Baseball manager and player
 James McRae (born 1987), Australian former representative rower
 James McRae (United States Army officer) (1862–1940), United States Army officer who served in numerous conflicts
 James W. McRae (1910–1960), American engineer
 Jimmy McRae (born 1943), British rally champion
 John J. McRae (1815–1868), American Democratic politician
 John Rodney McRae (1934–2005), American murderer
 Jordan McRae (born 1991), American basketball player
 Ken McRae (born 1968), Canadian ice hockey player
 Mike McRae (born 1955), American long jumper
 Mike McRae (baseball), Canadian college baseball coach
 Shaun McRae (born 1959), Australian rugby league coach
 Thomas Chipman McRae (1851–1929), American politician
 Tate McRae (born 2003), Canadian singer and dancer
 Tim McRae (born 1970), Olympic weightlifter for the United States
 Tom McRae, British singer-songwriter
 Wally McRae (born 1936), American cowboy poet
 William McRae (1909–1973), American college football player and judge
 William McRae (botanist) (1878–1952), Scottish botanist
 Willie McRae (1923–1985), Scottish politician

Places

Canada
 McRae, Alberta

United States
 McRae, Alabama
 McRae, Arkansas
 McRae, Florida
 McRae, Georgia
 McRae–Helena, Georgia, formed by the 2015 merger of the two cities
 McRae, Virginia
 Fort McRae, a Union Army post in what is now Sierra County, New Mexico

Other uses
 CSS McRae, a Confederate gunboat in the American Civil War
 McRae River, a river in the Marlborough Region of New Zealand's South Island
 McRae River (Western Australia), a river in the Kimberley region of Western Australia
 McRae's, an American department store chain

See also
 Clan MacRae, Scottish clan
 Governor McRae (disambiguation)
 Justice McRae (disambiguation)
 MacRae (disambiguation)
 McCray (disambiguation)